AeroDreams S.A. is a defense contractor based in Buenos Aires, Argentina. It has been working since 2001 in developing unmanned aerial vehicles for military and non-military use. The company's CEO is Raúl Fernández.

The company developed and manufactured the Chi-7 helicopter.

The Strix project for the Argentine Air Force (Fuerza Aérea Argentina, FAA) was developed by this company.

List of aircraft 
Several of the models listed below are (or were) manufactured in several variants:
 AeroDreams Chi-7
 AeroDreams Strix
 AeroDreams Petrel
 AeroDreams Ñancú
 AeroDreams ADS-401
 Guardian

See also 
 Nostromo Defensa
 Cicaré

References

External links 
 Official web-site

Aircraft manufacturers of Argentina
Helicopter manufacturers of Argentina
Defense companies of Argentina
Manufacturing companies based in Buenos Aires
Unmanned aerial vehicle manufacturers
Companies established in 2001
Argentine brands
2001 establishments in Argentina